Old Kyiv or Old Kiev is a historical neighborhood of Kyiv. Other names include Upper City, Old Town, and others. It is located at the far eastern portion of the Shevchenko Raion. Old Kyiv historically represents the city of Yaroslav the Wise before it was presumably destroyed by the Mongol invasion of Batu Khan in 1240.

Originated at the Old Kyiv Hill (Starokievsky Holm), it was created in contrast to the Lower City, Podil. Presumably it started out from the ancient settlement of Kyi sometime at the start of the 6th century. In the 9–10th centuries it covered only  mostly at the western portion of the Old Kyiv Hill. Today at that location stands the National Historical Museum of Ukraine.

The first fortifications supposedly were built during the reign of Volodymyr the Great, creating what is known as the city of Volodymyr that covered already . The city of Yaroslav included monasteries such as the Sophia monastery, monasteries of Saint George and Saint Irina. It also included the city of Izyaslav around the Saint Michael's Golden Dome Monastery and the Kopyrev End.

After the Mongol devastation of the city, the Upper City lost its significance and the Kyiv city center was transferred to Podil. During the Polish-Russian War in the 17th century, the city was secured by Russia through financial compensation. During that time the Upper city was reinforced with a number of fortifications when Kyiv started to quarter a Russian garrison. However soon the garrison was transferred to Pechersk (Caves) and fortifications were decaying and getting ruined. In the 19th century the whole area came under complete reconstruction. It was then that the modern network of streets, squares, and parks was established.

Attractions
 St. Michael's Golden-Domed Monastery
 Saint Sophia's Cathedral
 St Andrew's Church
 Volodymyrska Hill
 National University of Theatre, Film and TV
 Golden Gates
 Building of the Ministry of Foreign Affairs (location of former Saint Basil [Three-Saints] Church)
 Bohdan Khmelnytsky Monument

Gallery

External links
 Kyiv Encyclopedia. WEK.
 Old Towne. From the Church of Tithe to the Yaroslav's motte.

Neighborhoods in Kyiv
Shevchenkivskyi District, Kyiv
Hills of Kyiv
Historic sites in Kyiv